"Fallingwater" is a song written, co-produced and performed by American indie pop singer Maggie Rogers, issued as the third single from her debut studio album Heard It in a Past Life (2019). On November 3, 2018, Rogers performed the song on Saturday Night Live.

Music video

The official music video for "Fallingwater" was directed by Zia Anger.

Chart positions

References

External links
 
 

2016 songs
2018 singles
Capitol Records singles
Maggie Rogers songs
Song recordings produced by Maggie Rogers
Song recordings produced by Rostam Batmanglij
Songs written by Maggie Rogers